Anti-product may refer to:

Chemistry
 Anti-product, an anti-isomer or anti addition

Music
 Anti-product, a hardcore punk band fronted by vocalist Taina Asili
 Anti-Product, a song on the album The New Black by Strapping Young Lad